The 1892 United States presidential election in Virginia took place on November 8, 1892, as part of the 1892 United States presidential election. Voters chose 12 representatives, or electors to the Electoral College, who voted for president and vice president.

Virginia voted for the Democratic candidate, former President Grover Cleveland over the Republican candidate, incumbent President Benjamin Harrison. Cleveland won the state by a margin of 17.46%.

Results

Results by county

Notes

References

Virginia
1892
1892 Virginia elections